Zhanar Seyitakhmetqyzy Aitzhanova (Janar Seiıtahmetqyzy Aitjanova; born 9 May 1965) is a Permanent Representative of the Republic of Kazakhstan to the United Nations Office at Geneva. She holds the rank of Envoy Extraordinary and Plenipotentiary 1st Class.

Early life and professional experience 
She was born on 9 May 1965 on a sovkhoz in the South Kazakhstan Region of the Kazakh SSR. In 1982, at the age of 17, she enrolled in the Kazakh State University, graduating in 1988 with a diploma in History and the English Language. In 1989, she began her post-graduate research program at Moscow State University. In the early 90s, she continued her studies at the Charles University and the Central European University in Prague. From 1996-1997, she worked in the Executive Program in Economics and Public Finance at the Joint Vienna Institute. She earned her masters in 2003 from the Harvard Kennedy School of Government.

Diplomatic and political career 
From 1998-1999, he was the UNDP Assistant Resident Representative in Mongolia. In 2003, she became Deputy Minister of Industry and Trade, and in 2005, she became Special Representative of Kazakhstan at the World Trade Organization Accession Negotiations. From 2010 to 2016, she was Minister of Economic Development and Trade as well as Minister of Economic Integration. From June 2016 to September 2019, she served as Ambassador to the Swiss Confederation. In May 2017, she picked up the role of Kazakh envoy to the Vatican and to the Principality of Liechtenstein concurrently. Since June 2016, she has been the Permanent Representative to the United Nations Office and other International Organizations in Geneva.

Personal life 
She is married with two sons. Outside of Kazakh and Russian, she speaks English and Czech.

Awards 

 Order of Kurmet
 Medal "For Valiant Labor".
 Medal "For contribution to the creation of the Eurasian Economic Union" 1st Degree (May 13, 2015 by the Supreme Council of the Eurasian Economic Union)

References 

1965 births
Living people
Government ministers of Kazakhstan
Women government ministers of Kazakhstan
Al-Farabi Kazakh National University alumni
Harvard Kennedy School alumni